Colostethus yaguara is a species of frog in the family Dendrobatidae. It is endemic to Colombia where it is only known from its type locality, Ituango, on the Cordillera Occidental in the northern Antioquia Department. It might be conspecific with Colostethus fraterdanieli.
Its natural habitats are cloud forests where it can be found in leaf-litter near streams.

References

yaguara
Amphibians of Colombia
Endemic fauna of Colombia
Amphibians described in 1991
Taxonomy articles created by Polbot